Warrior Champions: From Baghdad to Beijing is a 2009 American documentary film directed by the Renaud Brothers. The films tells the individual stories of four American soldiers who lost limbs or suffered paralysis in the Iraq War, and of their training to try for a position on the 2008 U.S. Paralympic team and their journey to the 2008 Summer Paralympics in Beijing.

Athletes
The films features:
Kortney Clemons (track and field)
Carlos Leon (shot put)
Melissa Stockwell (swimming)
Scott Winkler (shot put)

Awards
Best Political Feature, SINY Film Festival 2010
Documentary Prize, Naples International Film Festival 2010

Festival selections
Austin Film Festival 2009
Hot Springs Documentary Film Festival 2009
Tiburon International Film Festival 2010
Cleveland International Film Festival 2010
Newport Beach Film Festival 2010
ReelAbilities Disabilities Film Festival 2010

References

External links

American sports documentary films
Documentary films about the Iraq War
Documentary films about sportspeople with disability
Documentary films about veterans
Documentary films about the Olympics
2008 Summer Paralympics
2009 films
2009 documentary films
2000s English-language films
2000s American films